Coscinia is a genus of tiger moths in the family Erebidae. The genus was erected by Jacob Hübner in 1819.

Species
 Coscinia bifasciata (Rambur, 1832)
 Coscinia cribraria (Linnaeus, 1758)
 Coscinia liouvillei Le Cerf, 1928
 Coscinia libyssa (Püngeler, 1907)
 Coscinia mariarosae Expósito, 1991
 Coscinia romei Sagarra, 1924

Species formerly placed in Coscinia
 Spiris striata Linnaeus, 1758
 Syn. Coscinia striata

References

Callimorphina
Moth genera